The Treaty of Ceprano was signed on June 29, 1080 between Pope Gregory VII and the Normans. Based on the terms of the accord, the Pope established an alliance with Robert Guiscard and recognized his conquests.

See also
List of treaties

External links
Timelines

1080
Ceprano
Ceprano
Treaties of the Duchy of Normandy